Oscar Williams was a film actor, screenwriter and film director. He was born in the West Indies and raised in the United States.

Filmography 
Director:
Death Drug (1978)
Hot Potato (1976) (also screenwriter)
Five on the Black Hand Side (1973)
The Final Comedown (1972) (also screenwriter) ( Blast!)

Writer:
Truck Turner (1974) (a.k.a. Black Bullet)
Black Belt Jones (1974)

References

External links 
 

American male film actors
American film directors
American male screenwriters
Year of birth missing (living people)
Living people
African-American directors
21st-century African-American people